The 1930 Imperial Conference was the sixth Imperial Conference bringing together the prime ministers of the dominions of the British Empire. It was held in London. The conference was notable for producing the Statute of Westminster, which established legislative equality for the self-governing Dominions of the British Empire with Great Britain, thereby marking the effective legislative independence of these countries. Economic relations within the British Empire was also a key topic with proposals for a system of Imperial preference - empire-wide trade barriers against foreign (i.e. non-empire) goods. These proposals were further discussed at the British Empire Economic Conference in 1932.

Background
The 1926 Imperial Conference produced the Balfour Declaration that Dominions were autonomous and not subordinate to Great Britain. The 1929 Conference on Dominion Legislation and Merchant Shipping Laws was intended to move from the Balfour Declaration's broad statement of principle to a substantive legal framework, but the Irish Free State and the Union of South Africa demanded greater practical autonomy than the other attendees would allow. The 1930 Conference would instead address the issue.

Historian George Woodcock argues it marks the beginning of the end of the British Empire.

The Conference

The conference was hosted by King-Emperor George V, with his Prime Ministers and members of their respective cabinets:

References

Citations

Sources and further reading
 Holland, R. F. "The 1930 Imperial Conference." in Britain and the Commonwealth Alliance 1918–1939 (Palgrave Macmillan, 1981) pp. 115–126.
 JWW-B. "The Imperial Conferences of 1926-1930 and the Conduct of Foreign Policy." Bulletin of International News (1931): 3-11 online.
 Keith, Berriedale. "The Imperial Conference of 1930." Journal of Comparative Legislative and International Law 3d ser. 13 (1931): 26+.
 Woodcock, George. (1974) "1930: The Climacteric of Empire." History Today (Oct 1974), Vol. 24 Issue 10, pp 673–683 online. 
 
 

Imperial Conference
History of the Commonwealth of Nations
Imperial Conference
1930 in international relations
Events in London
1930 conferences
1930 in the British Empire
October 1930 events
November 1930 events
1930s in the City of Westminster
George V
Ramsay MacDonald